Daylight, Moonlight: Live In Yakushiji is a 2 disc live album by Kitaro.  It was recorded over three evenings at the Yakushi-ji temple in the ancient Japanese capital of Nara.

Track listing
Disk 1

Disk 2

Personnel
Kitaro : Keyboards
Keiko Takahashi : Keyboards
Shinji Ebihara : Keyboards
Yayoi Sakiyama : Violin
Tomoko Nomura : Percussion
Gary Barlough - Engineer
Dave Collins - Mastering Engineer

Additional Personnel
Eiichi Naito : Executive Producer, Management
Dino Malito : Artists & Repertoire, Management

References

External links
Kitaro Official site (English)
Kitaro Official site (Japanese)
Kitaro TV - Kitaro's official YouTube page
Kitaro Facebook

2002 live albums
Kitarō albums